The Grand Junction Canal is a canal in England from Braunston in Northamptonshire to the River Thames at Brentford, with a number of branches.  The mainline was built between 1793 and 1805, to improve the route from the Midlands to London, by-passing the upper reaches of the River Thames near Oxford, thus shortening the journey.

In 1927 the canal was bought by the Regent's Canal Company and, since 1 January 1929, has formed the southern half of the Grand Union Main Line from London to Birmingham.  The canal is now much used by leisure traffic.

Isambard Kingdom Brunel's last major undertaking was the compact Three Bridges, London, on the canal. Work began in 1856, and was completed in 1859. The three bridges are an overlapping arrangement allowing the routes of the Grand Junction Canal, Great Western and Brentford Railway, and Windmill Lane to cross.

History

Need 
By 1790, an extensive network of canals was in place, or under construction, in the Midlands. However, the only route to London was via the Oxford Canal to the River Thames at Oxford, and then down the river to the capital.  The river, particularly the upper reaches, was in a poor condition for navigation compared with the modern canals.  The river suffered from shallow sections and shortage of water leading to delays at locks, and there were frequent conflicts with mill owners over water supplies.

In 1791–92, two surveys of a route from Brentford on the Thames to Braunston on the Oxford Canal were carried out, first by James Barnes and then by William Jessop. There were other proposals for an alternative direct route to London, and two bills were put to Parliament, but it was the Bill for the Grand Junction Canal which was passed on 30 April 1793.

Construction 
The Act of Parliament authorised the company to raise up to £600,000 to fund construction of the main line from where the eastern branch of the River Brent enters the Thames adjoining Syon Park in the parish of Brentford, to the Oxford Canal at Braunston. It also authorised branches to Daventry, the River Nene at Northampton, to the turnpike road (now the A5) at Old Stratford, and to Watford: those to Daventry and Watford were not built.

William Jessop was appointed to take charge of construction which started almost immediately from both ends. On 3 June 1793 an engineer, James Barnes, was appointed at the rate of two guineas (£2 2s) per day plus half a guinea (10s 6d) expenses.

At the north end, there were problems with the construction of Blisworth Tunnel: quicksand was encountered, and errors made in alignment which meant that the tunnel had a pronounced wiggle. With the opening of Braunston Tunnel, the line was open from the Oxford Canal through to Weedon Bec in June 1796. However, Blisworth Tunnel continued to cause problems, collapsing in January 1796. The canal was opened from Braunston to Blisworth in 1797. The canal from the Thames reached Two Waters near Hemel Hempstead in 1798, Bulbourne at the north end of the Tring summit in 1799, and Stoke Bruerne at the south end of Blisworth Tunnel the following year.

Thus, with the exception of Blisworth Tunnel, the main line was fully open in 1800. To allow goods to cross the gap, a road was built in 1800 over the top of Blisworth hill and, later, upon the recommendation of committee member Joseph Wilkes, Benjamin Outram was contracted to build a tramway over the hill.

James Barnes proposed that work begin again on the tunnel on a new line. Robert Whitworth and John Rennie were called in for advice, and supported this proposal. However, construction on the new line did not start until June 1802, and was not completed until March 1805.

Initially, nine locks were used in a temporary arrangement to lower and raise the canal for the crossing of the River Great Ouse at Wolverton at the river's water level. In 1799, William Jessop designed a three-arch masonry aqueduct and embankment to cross the river and replace the locks. This collapsed in 1808, and a wooden trough was used as a temporary replacement. It was decided to build an iron aqueduct, with Benjamin Bevan as engineer. The foundation stone for the replacement aqueduct was laid on 9 September 1809, and it was opened on 22 January 1811.

The Grand Junction Canal had reduced the distance to London from the Midlands by —via Oxford and the River Thames—and made the journey reliable. As a result, it thrived: in 1810 it carried 343,560 tons of goods through London, with roughly equal amounts into and out of the capital.

The branches 
The Grand Junction's original act in 1793 authorised branches to Daventry, the River Nene at Northampton, to the turnpike road at Old Stratford (north-west of the modern Milton Keynes), and to Watford in Hertfordshire: those to Daventry and Watford were not built. The branch to Old Stratford was amended before it was built (see below). The branch to Northampton was delayed as the plans of the Leicestershire and Northamptonshire Union Canal to reach Northampton and thus join with the Grand Junction came to nothing. The link to Northampton was made by a tramroad transferred from Blisworth Tunnel, with the  canal from Gayton being opened in 1815. The link to Leicester was eventually achieved by the opening of the Grand Union Canal, which took a more direct route from Foxton in Leicestershire to the Grand Junction at Norton Junction.

The 1794 act authorised three further branches, to Aylesbury, Buckingham, and Wendover. The  navigable feeder from Wendover to the summit level at Tring was opened in 1799, while the  Buckingham branch, an extension of the original proposal for a link to the main road at Old Stratford, was opened in 1801: both eventually fell into disuse, though the Wendover Arm is undergoing active restoration, and part of it is again navigable. The Aylesbury arm was envisaged to become a through route to the Thames and thus to the Wilts and Berks Canal and the Kennet and Avon Canal, but the 6-mile (10-kilometre) branch into the town, opened in 1815, was never extended.

The act of April 1795 authorised a  branch to Paddington from Bull's Bridge near Hayes: this was completed in 1801 and, with its large basin at Paddington and many wharfs along its length, it became an important trade route, even more so with the subsequent opening of the Regent's Canal. This branch also acted as a source of water from the River Brent.

The act of June 1795 authorised a branch to St Albans: this was not built.

The last branch to be authorised and built was the  route to Slough, opened in 1882.

Acts of Parliament 
 33 Geo. III c. 80, received Royal Assent on 30 April 1793
An Act for making and maintaining a navigable Canal from the Oxford Canal Navigation at Braunston, in the county of Northampton, to join the River Thames at or near Brentford, in the county of Middlesex; and also certain collateral Cuts from the said intended Canal.
 34 Geo. III c. 24, received Royal Assent on 28 March 1794
An Act for making certain navigable Cuts from the towns of Buckingham, Aylesbury, and Wendover, in the county of Buckingham, to communicate with the Grand Junction Navigation authorized to be made by an Act of the last Session of Parliament, and for amending the said Act.
 35 Geo. III c. 8, received Royal Assent on 5 March 1795
An Act for authorizing the Company of the Grand Junction Canal to vary the Course of a certain Part of the said Canal, in the county of Hertford, so as to render the Navigation thereof more safe and convenient, and for making some other Amendments and Alterations in an Act made in the Thirty-third Year of the Reign of his present Majesty, for making the said Canal.
 35 Geo. III c. 43, received Royal Assent on 28 April 1795
An Act for making a navigable Cut from the Grand Junction Canal, in the precinct of Norwood, in the county of Middlesex, to Paddington, in the said county
 35 Geo. III c. 85, received Royal Assent on 2 June 1795
An Act for making and extending a navigable Cut from the town of Watford, in the county of Hertford, to the town of St. Alban, in the same county,
 36 Geo. III c. 25, received Royal Assent on 24 December 1795
An Act to enable the Company of Proprietors of the Grand Junction Canal to finish and complete the same, and the several Cuts and other Works authorized to be made and done by them, by virtue of several Acts of Parliament
 38 Geo. III c. 33, received Royal Assent on 26 May 1798
An Act for confirming and carrying into Execution certain Articles of Agreement made and entered into between Beilby, Lord Bishop of London, Thomas Wood, Esq. Sir John Frederick, Bart. and Arthur Stanhope, Esq. Sir John Morshead, Bart. and Dame Elizabeth his wife, and Robert Thistlethwaite, Esq. and Selina his wife, and the Company of Proprietors of the Grand Junction Canal; and for other Purposes therein-mentioned
 41 Geo. III c. 71, received Royal Assent on 20 June 1801
An Act for enabling the Company of Proprietors of the Grand Junction Canal more effectually to provide for the Discharge of their Debts, and to complete the whole of the Works to be executed by them, in pursuance of the several Acts of the Thirty-third, Thirty-fourth, Thirty-fifth, Thirty-sixth, and Thirty-eighth Years of the Reign of his present Majesty; and for altering and enlarging the Powers and Provisions of the said Acts
 43 Geo. III c. 8, received Royal Assent on 24 March 1803
An Act for empowering the Company of Proprietors of the Grand Junction Canal, to raise a further Sum of Money to enable them to complete the Works authorized to be executed, in pursuance of the several Acts passed in the Thirty-third, Thirty-fourth, Thirty-fifth, Thirty-sixth, Thirty-eighth, and Forty-first Years of the Reign of his present Majesty; and for amending, altering, and enlarging the Powers and Provisions of the said Acts
 45 Geo. III c. 68, received Royal Assent on 27 June 1805
An Act for altering, amending, and enlarging the Powers of certain Acts for making and maintaining the Grand Junction Canal
 52 Geo. III c. 140, received Royal Assent on 9 June 1812
An Act to explain, amend, and enlarge the Powers of certain Acts passed for making and maintaining the Grand Junction Canal
 58 Geo. III c. 16, received Royal Assent on 17 March 1818
An Act to enable the Grand Junction Canal Company to vary the Line of Part of their Canal in the county of Hertford, and for altering and enlarging the Powers of several Acts relating to the said Canal.
 59 Geo. III c. 111, received Royal Assent on 22 June 1819
An Act to vary and alter certain Acts of his present Majesty, relating to the Grand Junction Canal, the Grand Junction Water Works, and the Regent's Canal, in order to effect an Exchange of Water, for the better Supply of the Regent's Canal Navigation and Grand Junction Water Works.

This list is incomplete. Among those missing are the act authorising construction of the Slough Arm, and acts in 1928 authorising the formation of the Grand Union Canal.

Further development 
A clause under their acts allowed the Grand Junction Canal to supply drinking water. Accordingly, the Grand Junction Waterworks Company was established in 1811, initially taking water from the River Colne, the River Brent and a reservoir in North West Middlesex now known as Ruislip Lido. These waters proved unsatisfactory and the company transferred its inlets to the River Thames.

The importance of trade between London and the Midlands meant that railway competition was an early threat to this canal compared with others in the country. John Rennie undertook a survey in 1824 for a London to Birmingham railway.

There were also ambitious proposals for new canals. In 1827 there was a proposal for a London and Birmingham Junction Canal from the Stratford-upon-Avon Canal to Braunston. In 1832, William Cubitt proposed a Central Union Canal from the Worcester and Birmingham Canal near Worcester Bar via Solihull to the Oxford at Ansty, while in 1833 there were proposals for a London and Birmingham Canal, from Stratford direct to the Regent's Canal, which would bypass the Grand Junction Canal entirely. This, together with the railway threats, spurred the Grand Junction into making improvements.

The London and Birmingham Railway was completed in 1838 and, with the exception of the Oxford Canal, the canals on the route from London to Birmingham co-operated to reduce tolls to compete with the railway. As a result, there was an increase in traffic, but income was significantly reduced.

To cope with the traffic volumes, the locks at Stoke Bruerne were duplicated in 1835, and new larger reservoirs built at Tring to ease a serious water shortage. In 1848 the Grand Junction entered the carrying trade, pitting its boats directly against the railway competition. From 1864, steam narrow boats were acquired, working with a butty, and these penetrated as far as the Erewash Canal. Carrying was given up in 1876 because it did not pay.

By 1871 the tunnels at Braunston and Blisworth were becoming bottlenecks and steam tugs were provided to tow strings of waiting boats through.

Under the encouragement of major carriers Fellows Morton & Clayton, the Grand Junction bought the (old) Grand Union Canal and the Leicestershire and Northamptonshire Union Canal in 1894 and worked with other navigations to encourage more through traffic to London: the Grand Junction was concerned that through traffic was being deterred by the poor condition and high tolls of the railway-owned Cromford Canal and Nottingham Canal.

An inclined plane was opened at Foxton Locks in 1900, as part of a plan to enable wide barges to use the Grand Union Canal and thus bring more traffic on to the main line of the Grand Junction from the east Midlands. Widening of the locks at Watford was also planned, but not carried through. Consideration was given to constructing other inclined planes as part of a plan to enlarge the canals to carry 80-ton barges, but no more were built.

With ever more traffic going by rail, the canal's only significant weapon was low tolls. While this slowed the decline in volumes, it did so only by large reductions in income, and consideration was given to amalgamations with other canals.

Concerns began to develop about the state of repair of the canal via Warwick to Birmingham, on which the Grand Junction was reliant for a through route. In 1925, discussions began with the three Warwick canals and the Regent's Canal, and in 1926 a merger was agreed. The Regent's Canal bought the Grand Junction Canal and the three Warwick canals, and from 1 January 1929 they became part of the (new) Grand Union Canal.

See also 

 Canals of Great Britain
 History of the British canal system

References

Further reading 
 Hadfield, C., and Skempton, A.W., (1979) William Jessop, Engineer David and Charles Publishers.
 Faulkner, Alan H., (1972) The Grand Junction Canal David and Charles Publishers.
 Hassell, John (1819) Tour of the Grand Junction, illustrated in a series of engravings, with an historical and topographical description of those parts of the counties of Middlesex, Hertfordshire, Buckinghamshire, Bedfordshire, and Northamptonshire, through which the canal passes Published by J. Hassell.  Internet Archive
The Mechanics' Magazine, Museum, Register, Journal and Gazette. (1834) Letter: "Improvement in the Locks of the Grand Junction Canal Company". Google Books
Hiscock, Fabian, (2019) 'Passing Through', The Grand Junction Canal in West Hertfordshire, 1791–1841 Hertfordshire Publications, an imprint of Hertfordshire University Press.

External links 
 
 
 

Canals in England
Canals opened in 1800